The village idiot , in strict terms is a person locally known for ignorance or stupidity but is also a common term for a stereotypically silly or nonsensical person or stock character.

Description
The term "village idiot" is also used as a stereotype of the mentally disabled. It has also been applied as an epithet for an unrealistically optimistic or naive individual.

The village idiot was long considered an acceptable social role, a unique individual who was dependent yet contributed to the social fabric of their community. As early as Byzantine times, the "village idiot" was treated as an acceptable form of disabled  individual compatible with then-prevailing normative conceptions of social order. The concept of a "village savant" or "village genius" is closely related, often tied to the concept of pre-industrial anti-intellectualism, as both figures are subjects of both pity and derision. The social roles of the two are combined and applied, especially in the sociopolitical context, in the European medieval/Renaissance court jester.

References

Developmental disabilities
Stock characters
Stereotypes
Social classes
Slurs related to low intelligence
Ignorance